Ethiopian Broadcasting Service (EBS TV) is an Ethiopian free to air television network. Launched in 2008, the network is based in Ethiopia with correspondents both in United States at its headquarters in Silver Spring, Maryland, U.S. EBS TV broadcasts programs in mostly Amharic.  EBS TV is the first private channel launched in Ethiopia.

EBS TV focuses various entertainments related subjects such as talk shows, game shows, movies, dramas and others. EBS TV is known for the production of the first local late night talk show, Seifu on EBS, hosted by Seifu Fantahun. The channel is available via Nilesat 7°W position and it is also being distributed on DStv as of March 2017.

TV channels

EBS Cinema 
EBS Cinema is a channel that focuses on only Ethiopian films, dramas and sitcoms and it is available via Ethiosat.

EBS Musika 
EBS Musika or music is a channel that broadcast only music content like pop, rap and classical music and its available via Ethiosat.

EBS HD 
EBS HD is the main channel that broadcasts news, sports, entertainment, economy and culture content and it is available via Ethiosat.

History 
EBS TV is the first privately run television network in Ethiopia. It also operates two other channels EBS Musika and EBS Cinema which can both, along with EBS TV, be found on Roku TV and NSS 12 Satellite 11105 V 45000.

In 2018, EBS TV was able to acquire a local broadcasting license. The company had to split into two separate entities, EBS Television Ethiopia Plc and EBS Television Global, in order to get the local broadcasting permit. As of April 2018 EBS is prepared a live transmission studios for the news and sports programs at its current headquarters located on Bawa Building, around Unity University in Gerji.

Programming

News and business 

 What's new  (news)
 Ethio business (business news) EBS Sport (sport news) Talk shows 
 Helen Show (serious matter show)
 Seifu on EBS (entertainment show) Tech Talk (related to technology)Dagi Show (serious matter show) Lifestyle shows 
 Semonun Addis Discover Ethiopia Chef Yohanis Tizitachin Ketimirt Alem Fashion (ሽክ)20-30 (ሀያ ሰላሳ)
 Kehiwot Seleda (ከህይወት ሠሌዳ)
 Ye Adey Gize (የአደይ ጊዜ)
 Discover Ethiopia (ኢትዮጵያን እንወቅ)

 Game shows and weekend programs 

 Kidamen Keseat (ቅዳሜን ከሰዓት)
 Ehudin Be EBS (እሁድን በኢቢኤስ)
 Yebeteseb Chewata (የቤተሰብ ጨዋታ)
 Mirtu Gebeta (ምርጡ ገበታ)

 Music 
 Sound Pulse EBS Musika EBS Music EBS Music Reggae & Afro Beat Dramas 
 አደይ (tragedy drama)''
 በሰንቱ (comedy drama)
 ሞጋቾቹ (drama)
 ዘመን (drama)
 ራኬብ (drama)
 ጎረቤታሞቹ (comedy,drama)
 የእግር እሳት (comedy)
 ደምብ (drama)
 የተቀበረው (drama)
 ወላፈን (drama)
 የራስ ጥላ (drama)
 ከተዘጋው ዶሴ (drama)

References 

Television channels in Ethiopia
Television channels and stations established in 2008
Television stations in Maryland
Satellite television
Pay television